The S1 is a railway service of the St. Gallen S-Bahn that provides half-hourly service between  and , via , in the Swiss cantons of Zürich, Thurgau, Schaffhausen, and St. Gallen. THURBO, a joint venture of Swiss Federal Railways and the canton of Thurgau, operates the service.

Operations 

The S1 operates every half-hour between Schaffhausen and Wil over the Lake line (Schaffhausen–), Bodensee–Toggenburg line (Romanshorn–), and St. Gallen–Winterthur line (St. Gallen–Wil).

Route 

  –  –  –  –  – 

 Wil SG
 
 
 
 
 
 St. Gallen
 
 
  (stops only on request)
  (stops only on request)
 
 
  (stops only on request)
 Romanshorn
  (stops only on request)
  (stops only on request)
  (stops only on request)
  (stops only on request) 
  (stops only on request)
  (stops only on request)
  (stops only on request)
  (stops only on request)
  (stops only on request)
 
 Kreuzlingen
  (stops only on request)
  (stops only on request)
  (stops only on request)
  (stops only on request)
  (stops only on request)
 
  (stops only on request)
  (stops only on request)
 Stein am Rhein
  (stops only on request)
  (stops only on request)
 
  (stops only on request)
  (stops only on request)
  (stops only on request)
  (stops only on request)
 Schaffhausen

History 
With the December 2018 change the S1 began running half-hourly and InterRegio 13 replaced the Rheintal-Express.

Between the December 2018 and December 2021 timetable changes the S1 operated every half-hour between Wil and St. Gallen, continuing from St. Gallen to Schaffhausen as the S8. With the December 2021 timetable change, the entire Wil–St. Gallen–Schaffhausen route was designated as the S1, albeit with the timetable color formerly associated with the S8.

References

External links 

 2022 network map

St. Gallen S-Bahn lines
Transport in the canton of St. Gallen